The Blond Beast or The Blonde Beast may refer to:

A metaphor used in On the Genealogy of Morality by Friedrich Nietzsche
A nickname for Reinhard Heydrich, a German Nazi official